Organic Farming Association of India (OFAI) is a pan Indian organisation for organic farmers. It claims to be the biggest network for organic farmers.

The organisation organize various conferences, conventions and events to promote organic farming. The organisation also hosted "Organic World Congress" in 2017. The event was attended by the President of India and several ministers.

References 

2002 establishments in Goa
Organic farming organizations
Organic farming in Asia
Organisations based in Goa
Organizations established in 2002